Zahawi or Al-Zahawi is a Kurdish surname meaning 'pride'.

Notable people so named include:
 Nadhim Zahawi (born 1967), British politician
 Jamil Sidqi al-Zahawi (1863–1936), Iraqi poet and philosopher
 Khalil al-Zahawi (1946–2007), Iraqi calligrapher
 Muqbil Al-Zahawi (born 1935), Iraqi artist
 Nadhim al-Zahawi, Iraqi politician and grandfather of Nadhim Zahawi 

Arabic-language surnames